Hossam AlJabri (Arabic: حسام الجابري) is an activist, preacher and speaker on Islam and Muslims.   He is the former Executive Director of a national Muslim organization, the Muslim American Society. He is the former president of the Muslim American Society – Boston Chapter, and a trustee of the Interreligious Center on Public Life (ICPL). He is a signatory of the "Building a Community of Trust" declaration of peace, affirming a positive relation between Jews and Muslims and the right of both people to live and prosper in Israel/Palestine. AlJabri is a speaker in national conferences, such as the MAS-ICNA national conventions.

Biography
AlJabri migrated from Egypt to the US at the age of 12. He holds an Engineering degree, an MBA and a certificate in Nonprofit Strategic Management from Harvard University. He studied Islamic studies with traditional scholars, and in the Islamic American University, the American Open University, and Boston University.

Community service
AlJbari serves on the following boards:
Board of Directors, Muslim American Society Boston Chapter , and ISB Cultural Center.
Board of Trustees, the Interreligious Center on Public Life (ICPL).
Board of Directors,  Common Ground.
Board of Advisors, RUAH.
Board of Advisors Harvard University, Islam in the West Project, Boston Muslims Survey.

AlJabri is an alumnus of the FBI Citizens Academy and a member of BRIDGES forum, bringing law enforcement agencies and community leaders together for better understanding and service.

Imam, Khatib
AlJabri is a regular Imam and Khatib, delivering the Friday Sermon in the following mosques and universities in Massachusetts:
ISBCC , Roxbury.
Islamic Center of Boston, Wayland 
Islamic Center of New England, Sharon
Islamic Society of Boston, Cambridge
Harvard University, Cambridge
Boston University, Boston
Longwood Medical Center, Boston
MGH, Boston
Al-Huda Society, Revere
Islamic Center of Burlington, Burlington

References

American imams
Living people
Egyptian emigrants to the United States
Boston University alumni
Year of birth missing (living people)
Harvard School of Engineering and Applied Sciences alumni
Harvard Business School alumni